Vytautas Vičiulis (16 October 1951 in Skuodas district – 3 March 1989 in Klaipėda) was a Lithuanian painter and antiques restorer, better known for his self-immolation for political reasons. Protesting against the Soviet occupation of the Baltic States, he burned himself in Klaipėda close to the monument of Lenin in the late evening of 2 March 1989. Severely burned, he died in hospital at 9 pm on 3 March. Vičiulis used fuel to set himself ablaze. Remains of the flag of Lithuania were found on his body.

See also 
 Romas Kalanta

References 

1951 births
1989 suicides
People from Skuodas District Municipality
Lithuanian anti-communists
Soviet dissidents
People of the Singing Revolution
Painters who committed suicide
Self-immolations in protest of the Eastern Bloc
Suicides in the Soviet Union
Suicides in Lithuania
20th-century Lithuanian painters